The Betta Kurumba language (Beṭṭa Kurumba) is a Dravidian language closely related to Kannada and Tamil, and is spoken by 32,000 people in the Nilgiri mountains and in adjoining areas in Tamil Nadu, Karnataka and Kerala.
Beṭṭa means “hills” in Kannada and kurumba means “shepherd”.

See also
Kuruba
Betta Kuruba
Alu Kurumba
Jennu Kurumba
Dravidian languages
List of languages by number of native speakers in India
Languages of South Asia

Notes

References
Coelho, Gail Maria (2003): A Grammar of Betta Kurumba (PDF).
Coelho, Gail Maria (2018): Annotated Texts in Betta Kurumba. Brill.

External links 
 ELAR Open Access Archive

Tamil languages
Languages of Kerala
Kuruba